Teluk Kemang Bypass is a major highway in Port Dickson, Negeri Sembilan, Malaysia.

The Kilometre Zero of the Federal Route 219 is located at Pasir Panjang junctions.

At most sections, the bypass was built under the JKR R5 road standard, allowing maximum speed limit of up to 90 km/h.

List of interchanges

References

Highways in Malaysia
Malaysian Federal Roads